Dunton Green railway station is on the South Eastern Main Line in England, serving the village of Dunton Green, Kent. Trains calling at the station are operated by Southeastern.

History 
Until 1961 this station served as the junction for the Westerham Valley Branch Line to Brasted and Westerham. When this line was constructed, a subway was built which passed under the branch platform and allowed access from the main station forecourt to a footpath leading west to Dunton Green. This subway remains in place today.

Accidents and incidents 
On 23 April 2021, a tamper caught fire near the station and was severely damaged. Both lines were blocked.

Facilities
The station is unstaffed, having had its ticket office closed in the early 1990s. Tickets must now be purchased from the self-service ticket machine at the station which is also fitted with passenger help points and information screens on both platforms.

The station has a small car park which holds a total of 26 cars. The car park was free until November 2008 when charges were introduced and the car park is now operated by Saba Parking. There is also a small cycle rack at the station entrance.

The station has step-free access available to the London bound platform only as the Sevenoaks bound platform is only reachable through the use of steps.

Services 

The typical off-peak service in trains per hour is:
 2 tph to London Charing Cross via  and 
 2 tph to 

References

External links 

Railway stations in Kent
DfT Category F2 stations
Former South Eastern Railway (UK) stations
Railway stations in Great Britain opened in 1868
Railway stations served by Southeastern